The Vietnamese zodiac (Vietnamese: Mười hai con giáp) is the traditional Vietnamese classification scheme based on the lunar calendar that assigns an animal and its reputed attributes to each year in a repeating 12-year cycle. The Viet lunar calendar is divided into 60-year cycles known as hồi. Each of these consists of five 12-year animal cycles.

Zodiac
The Vietnamese zodiac is originated from the Chinese zodiac in its usage and arrangement of animals, but replaces the ox with the water buffalo and the rabbit with the cat. The Vietnamese zodiac uses cat instead of rabbit due to the pronunciation of the rabbit in Chinese writing: 卯 is very similar to the Vietnamese word Mèo for cat.

See also
 Vietnamese calendar
 Vietnamese dragon

References

Bibliography
 
 
 

Vietnamese culture
Vietnamese astrology